J. T. Ferguson Store, also known as the Ferguson Store or Parker Electric Co., is a historic commercial building located at Wilkesboro, Wilkes County, North Carolina. It was built in 1887, and is a two-story brick building with a distinctive pressed metal facade.  The facade features a combination of classical and late Victorian details.

It was listed on the National Register of Historic Places in 1982.

References

Commercial buildings on the National Register of Historic Places in North Carolina
Victorian architecture in North Carolina
Neoclassical architecture in North Carolina
Commercial buildings completed in 1887
Buildings and structures in Wilkes County, North Carolina
National Register of Historic Places in Wilkes County, North Carolina